Xiamen Bay, formerly known as Amoy Bay, is a partially enclosed bay off the coast of Xiamen in China's Fujian Province. It is bound by the Kinmen Islands and the Taiwan Strait.

Geography 
The bay is formed by down-faulted depressed block of undersea bed creating a submerged bay.

The water depth around the bay range from 6 to 25 metres and has a deep water coastal area of 30 km.

Economy 
Xiamen Bay is an important economic region for Xiamen as well as the whole of Fujian Province. The bay has numerous port, transport infrastructure, shipbuilding and petrochemical industries. The local government has set up various development areas such as the Xiamen Bay Photoelectric Industrial City to promote economic development.

Due to rapid economic development and industrialization in Xiamen, the bay has been tested for traces of heavy metal contamination.

References 

Bays of China
Geography of Xiamen
Bodies of water of Fujian